Frank Dunphy (27 November 1937 – 23 August 2020)  was an Irish-born, British-based business manager, entrepreneur and accountant. He represented the interests of such artists and actors as Damien Hirst, Tracey Emin, Jake and Dinos Chapman and Ray Winstone.

Early life in Ireland
Dunphy was born in Portrane. His father was a nurse and his mother was a republican activist and member of Cumann na mBan. He was married to Lorna.

Career
Dunphy moved to England in the early 1950s and began his career in representation advising performers including Coco the Clown, Harry Worth, and Roy Castle. He reputedly charged his clients 10% of all sales/income revenue.

Damien Hirst
Dunphy has represented artist Damien Hirst since 1995. He claimed he was first asked to represent artist Hirst by Hirst's mother, Mary, a claim which the artist has disputed.

In 2018, Dunphy and his wife gave six works by Young British Artists to the Pallant House Gallery, Chichester, including Butterfly by Hirst.

References

1937 births
2020 deaths
Businesspeople from County Dublin
Talent agents
Irish expatriates in England